This is a list of numbered highways in the province of Prince Edward Island.

Arterial highways 
Prince Edward relies mostly on arterial roads for major inter-city routes. The only expressway in the entire province is the Cornwall Bypass which is entirely part of Route 1 (there are no full-fledged freeways). Another section of highway in the province designated a limited access road is part of the Charlottetown Perimeter Highway, between Upton Road and St. Peters Rd. Maximum speed limit on arterial highways is typically .

Collector highways 

Local routes 
These are paved and unpaved local roads. The maximum speed limit 80 km/h (50 mph) but typical speed limits are 50–60 km/h (30-40 mph).

Prince County

Queens County

Kings County

References

External links

 
 Prince Edward Island Highway Route Sign Photos by Martin Durocher

Prince Edward Island provincial highways
 
Highways